Otterlo is a village in the municipality of Ede of province of Gelderland in the Netherlands, in or near the Nationaal Park De Hoge Veluwe.

The Kröller-Müller Museum, named after Helene Kröller-Müller, is situated nearby and has the world's second largest collection of Vincent van Gogh paintings.

Otterlo was a separate municipality until 1818, when it merged with Ede.

History

Second World War 
During the first four years of the war, Otterlo was relatively unharmed. The local resistance made use of a secret telephone connection from an electrician's house, which in 2021 still stands at the dorpsstraat, behind barber Prophitius, to communicate with the allies below the river Rhine (1944/1945). During the war, multiple families hid Jewish people from the Germans. One location was betrayed however, resulting in a raid in 1944 at the house 'De Lindenhof' at the Hoenderlooseweg. 

During the liberation of Netherlands in April 1945, Otterlo was the center of a fierce and bloody battle between German and British and Canadian soldiers. See the Battle of Otterlo.

References

External links

CBC Archives - CBC Radio reporting from Otterlo April 17, 1945.
The Battle of Otterlo (documentary)

Ede, Netherlands
Populated places in Gelderland
Former municipalities of Gelderland